The 2019 season was the Miami Dolphins' 50th in the National Football League (NFL), their 54th overall and their first under new head coach Brian Flores.

Early in the season, the Dolphins were believed by many people to be intentionally losing games in hopes of getting a better draft position, most notably for Alabama quarterback Tua Tagovailoa, who at the time, was considered the likely first pick in the 2020 NFL Draft before suffering a season-ending hip injury on November 16, 2019. A common refrain at the time was, "Tank for Tua". Through Week 8, the Dolphins traded key contributors including recent first round picks Laremy Tunsil and Minkah Fitzpatrick, along with Kenyan Drake, and Ryan Tannehill.

It was the Dolphins' first season since 2011 without Ryan Tannehill, as he was traded along with the draft rights of David Long Jr. to the Tennessee Titans in exchange for the draft rights of Solomon Kindley in 2019 and Chandler Cox in 2020 during the offseason. After Tannehill was traded, the Dolphins would go on to sign journeyman quarterback Ryan Fitzpatrick and trade for Arizona Cardinals quarterback Josh Rosen. As he outplayed Rosen during training camp, Fitzpatrick started the majority of the season, with Rosen starting from Weeks 3 to 6. On December 22, Fitzpatrick became the first Dolphins' quarterback since Dan Marino to pass for 400 yards and four touchdowns. Despite defeating the Philadelphia Eagles in Week 13, the Dolphins were eliminated from playoff contention for the third consecutive year after the Pittsburgh Steelers won that same day.

Ultimately failing to improve on their 7–9 record from the previous season, the team started the season 0–7, but rallied to win five of their last nine games. Although the victories prevented the Dolphins from obtaining the first overall pick of the 2020 draft, they were able to select Tagovailoa, whose draft stock had fallen due to his injury.

This was the Dolphins' first season with exactly five wins since 1968 and their first since the league expanded to 16 games in 1978. It was also their first season winning fewer than six games since their franchise-worst 2007 season. Additionally, it was the Dolphins' first season since 2004 without long-time snapper John Denney, as he was released on September 2, 2019. Denney was the longest tenured player on the Dolphins' roster prior to his release, having been with the team since 2005. It made 5th-year wide receiver DeVante Parker the new longest-tenured player on the roster.

This season marked the first time since the  1997 Season that the Dolphins failed to have a pro bowler.

As of  2022, this is the last time the Dolphins had a losing season.

Offseason coaching change
The Dolphins fired head coach Adam Gase on December 31, 2018, after the team missed the playoffs for a second-straight season and finished 2018 with a 7–9 record. The Dolphins conducted interviews with several candidates such as team assistants Dowell Loggains and Darren Rizzi, Kansas City Chiefs offensive coordinator Eric Bieniemy, and New England Patriots linebackers coach, defensive play caller, and long-time assistant Brian Flores. The team was primarily linked to Flores but had to wait to hire him until after the Patriots were out of the NFL playoffs due to league rules. Flores served in several positions with the Patriots since their 2004 Super Bowl-winning season, beginning as a scout before getting promoted to Bill Belichick's coaching staff in 2008. Flores most recently served as New England's Linebackers' coach from 2016 to 2018, and was also part of three of their Super Bowl-winning squads (2014, 2016, and 2018), as well as the AFC-winning 2011 and 2017 squads. On February 4, 2019, the day after Super Bowl LIII, the team announced Flores as their thirteenth head coach. Prior to his hiring by the Dolphins, Flores was also interviewed for the head coaching vacancies of teams such as the Denver Broncos, Cleveland Browns, and Green Bay Packers. The Dolphins announced the majority of Flores' coaching staff on February 8, 2019, including Chad O'Shea as offensive coordinator, Patrick Graham as defensive coordinator, Danny Crossman as special teams coordinator, and former Indianapolis Colts/Detroit Lions head coach Jim Caldwell as assistant head coach and quarterbacks coach. On July 29, 2019, just four days into Dolphins camp, Flores sent a quick message by firing the OL Coach Pat Flaherty whom he had hired in the spring and replacing him with team analyst Dave DeGuglielmo. Flores had deemed Flaherty to be ineffective in implementing the team’s new system.

Draft

Draft Trades
The Miami Dolphins traded a conditional seventh-round selection to Detroit in exchange for defensive tackle Akeem Spence.

Staff

Final roster

Preseason

Regular season

Schedule

Note: Intra-division opponents are in bold text.

Game Summaries

Week 1: vs. Baltimore Ravens

The Dolphins opened their season against the Ravens in Week 1. The Dolphins gave up 49 yards on the first play from scrimmage, and they subsequently allowed Baltimore to score on that same possession. The next drive, Ryan Fitzpatrick was picked off, which already put the Dolphins in an early hole. The Dolphins' misery continued when the Ravens scored right after another Fitzpatrick interception. The Dolphins and Ravens exchanged punts and Ravens' scores. After the series of exchanges, the Dolphins finally got on the board cutting the Ravens lead to 28–3. The Dolphins ended the first half down 42–10, with the Preston Williams touchdown play from Ryan Fitzpatrick. That was the last scoring play by the Dolphins. The Dolphins' defense showed no signs of improvement later in the game with the Ravens scoring on three more drives. The Dolphins defense allowed 59 points off of a total of 643 yards, which was the most yards surrendered by any Dolphins team in NFL history. This was also the franchise's worst loss since a 62-7 loss to the Jacksonville Jaguars in the 1999 AFC Divisional Round.

Week 2: vs. New England Patriots

In their second consecutive poor performance, the Dolphins had seven possessions that went three-and-out, gave up two interceptions that were returned for touchdowns and starting quarterback Ryan Fitzpatrick was pulled in favor of his backup, Josh Rosen, after Fitzpatrick accounted for three out of the four interceptions thrown by both quarterbacks. The negative-92 point differential over the first two games was the worst since the 1973 New Orleans Saints, who also had a negative-92 point differential via blowout losses in the first two games of the season.

Week 3: at Dallas Cowboys

Quarterback Josh Rosen, acquired via trade prior to the season, made his first start as a Dolphin in place of Ryan Fitzpatrick. The Dolphins were seeking their first win over Dallas since 2003, and entered the game as 22-point underdogs. They showed some competitiveness by narrowing Dallas' lead to 10–6, but afterwards, the Dolphins proved they were no match against the Cowboys. Dallas scored the final 21 points of the game. With this loss, the Dolphins dropped to 0–3.

Week 4: vs. Los Angeles Chargers
Dolphins’ quarterback Josh Rosen led the Dolphins to their first lead of the season, 7-3, early in the game. By halftime, the Chargers led by a score of 17-10. After that, it was all Chargers as Bolts’ quarterback Philip Rivers tallied two touchdowns and 310 yards passing. This was the first time the Dolphins had lost at home to the Chargers since the 1982 Epic in Miami game, when the Chargers were still based in San Diego.

Week 6: vs. Washington Redskins

Josh Rosen was benched in the third quarter after an ineffective performance, throwing for just 85 yards and two interceptions on 25 passing attempts. Though the Redskins took an early 17–3 lead under a strong performance from running back Adrian Peterson, the Dolphins cut the deficit once Ryan Fitzpatrick took over at quarterback as he led Miami to two fourth quarter touchdowns. However, the Dolphins attempted a two-point conversion after their second touchdown and failed, sealing a 17–16 loss. This game was dubbed by many as the "Tank Bowl", this was the first time since 2004 that two winless teams met in Week 6 or later. Miami dropped to 0–5 for the first time since 2011.

Week 7: at Buffalo Bills

Ryan Fitzpatrick returned to the starting lineup against divisional rival Buffalo, whom he played for from 2009 to 2012. He had a strong second-quarter performance, which led to Miami holding only its second lead over an opponent during the season with a 14–9 halftime advantage, but the Bills rallied after CB Tre'Davious White intercepted Fitzpatrick in the third quarter. The Bills went on to score 22 points in the fourth quarter. With the 31–21 loss, Miami fell to 0–6.

Week 8: at Pittsburgh Steelers

The Ryan Fitzpatrick-led Dolphins' offense came out with a surprising 14–0 lead in the first quarter, but the Steelers scored 27 unanswered points to win behind strong performances from quarterback Mason Rudolph, running back James Conner and receiver JuJu Smith-Schuster. Former Dolphins' safety Minkah Fitzpatrick, who had been traded to the Steelers several weeks earlier, intercepted the Dolphins twice during the game. With the loss, Miami continued its winless streak to fall to 0–7.

Week 9: vs. New York Jets

In Jets' head coach Adam Gase's first return to Miami since being fired from the Dolphins the season prior, the Dolphins came out and won their first game of the season behind three touchdown passes from Ryan Fitzpatrick and sloppy play from the Jets. The win was costly, however, as the Dolphins lost leading receiver Preston Williams for the season with a torn ACL during the game.

Week 10: at Indianapolis Colts

The Dolphins went to Indianapolis and upset the Colts, who were without starting quarterback Jacoby Brissett, to earn their second win of the season, and improved to 2–7.

Week 11: vs. Buffalo Bills

For the second time this year, the Bills defeated the Miami Dolphins. Josh Allen scored four touchdowns, one running and three through the air for the victory at Hard Rock Stadium.

Week 12: at Cleveland Browns

Browns’ quarterback Baker Mayfield connected on 24 of 34 passing for 327 yards and three touchdowns while suffering only one interception to beat the Dolphins for the third meeting in a row.

Week 13: vs. Philadelphia Eagles
This was Eagles' running back Jay Ajayi's first return to Miami since the Dolphins traded him during the 2017 season, and the Dolphins came back from a 28-14 second half deficit. The Dolphins improved to 3–9 with the win but were eliminated from playoff contention thanks to the Steelers' victory that same day.

This game is famous for a trick play the Dolphins ran in the 2nd quarter. Down 10-7 with 4th and goal at the 1-yard line, the Dolphins audibled from a field goal formation to an offensive formation with Matt Haack in shotgun facing two rushers with no protection other than the center. The other linemen lined up in threes outside the numbers on both sides of the ball with a receiver behind them to make convoys. Kicker Jason Sanders lined up one-on-one in the left slot. Haack took the snap and immediately rolled to his left and the convoys started to block. The Eagles defenders engaged at the line of scrimmage but let Sanders slip behind the defense, and Haack flipped it to him for the score. The play was the first and, to date, only punter-to-kicker touchdown pass in NFL history.

Week 14: at New York Jets
On a typically cold and windy December afternoon in New Jersey, the Dolphins just couldn't manage to reach the end zone all day. The Fins tallied a total of 21 points via seven field goals, which turned out to be the difference in the game as they lost by a single point. Jets’ quarterback Sam Darnold had a mediocre day, but pulled out an ugly win. This was Dolphins' quarterback Ryan Fitzpatrick's first return to New York since leaving the Jets via free agency following the 2016 season. With the loss the Dolphins fell to 3–10.

Week 15: at New York Giants
The Dolphins were seeking a win over the Giants for the first time since 2003. With the loss, the Dolphins fell to 3–11 and were guaranteed to finish the season with their worst record since 2007, when they went 1–15. The Giants also snapped a nine-game losing streak, in a game that ended up being long-time quarterback Eli Manning's final start as a Giant. Manning announced his retirement from the NFL on January 22, 2020 after 16 years and winning two Super Bowls with the Giants.

Week 16: vs. Cincinnati Bengals

Opposing quarterbacks Andy Dalton and Ryan Fitzpatrick both scored four touchdowns apiece and were on fire in a close game in South Florida. The Bengals were down 35-12 when they rebounded to tie the game 35-35 and force overtime. Jason Sanders saved the day by booting a 37-yard field goal as the clock ticked down to zero for a Dolphins’ narrow victory.

Week 17: at New England Patriots

The Dolphins' regular-season finale against the Patriots was head coach Brian Flores' first return to Gillette Stadium since leaving the Patriots to become head coach of the Dolphins following the Patriots Super Bowl LIII victory on February 3, 2019. Flores served in multiple roles with the Patriots after their 2004 Super Bowl-winning season, winning four Super Bowls and serving as linebackers coach from 2016 to 2018 and de facto Defensive Coordinator during 2018. The Dolphins' stunning victory sealed by a touchdown pass from Ryan Fitzpatrick to Mike Gesicki with 0:29 remaining was one of the biggest upsets of the season. The win combined with a Kansas City Chiefs win denied the Patriots a first-round playoff bye for the first time since 2009, and was the Dolphins' first win in Gillette Stadium since 2008. It also ended up being Patriots' quarterback Tom Brady's final regular season game in a Patriots' uniform, as the Patriots lost to the Tennessee Titans in the Wild Card playoffs the following week, and Brady went on to sign with the Tampa Bay Buccaneers in the offseason after 20 years with the Patriots. Miami finished the season at 5–11.

Standings

Division

Conference

References

External links

Miami
Miami Dolphins seasons
Miami Dolphins